Terravecchia is a village and comune in the province of Cosenza in the Calabria region of southern Italy.

Geography
The village is bordered by Cariati, Crucoli and Scala Coeli.  Terravecchia is perched atop a hill approximately 3 kilometers SSW of the Ionian Sea coast.

References

Cities and towns in Calabria